The Woods is a 2006 American supernatural horror film directed by Lucky McKee and starring Agnes Bruckner, Patricia Clarkson, Rachel Nichols, Lauren Birkell and Bruce Campbell. Set in 1965, its plot concerns a wayward teenage girl who is sent to a New England all-girls private high school which holds an ominous secret related to the staff, history and woods surrounding the school.

Plot 
In 1965, after burning down a tree in her yard, rebel teenager Heather Fasulo is sent to the boarding school Falburn Academy in the middle of the woods by her estranged mother Alice Fasulo and negligent father Joe Fasulo. The headmistress, Ms. Traverse, accepts Heather in spite of her father's bad financial condition. The displaced Heather becomes close friends with Marcy Turner, while they are maltreated by their abusive classmate Samantha Wise. During the night, Heather has a nightmare of a student named Ann, covered in blood, and hears voices that seem to be coming from the woods. The next day, Marcy tells Heather that Ann was taken to a mental institution after attempting to commit suicide, and that she'd been covered in blood.

With the help of Marcy, Heather eventually learns to adjust to her new school, even having fun at times. Ms. Traverse subjects Heather to special tests to see if she is "gifted", telling her that it is all part of her scholarship to the academy. The girls tell Heather a spooky story about the history of Falburn, which includes three young redheaded sisters who arrived at the school and turned out to be witches, killing the headmistress before leaving to the woods. Meanwhile, Samantha continues to torment Heather, who comes to despise her and fights back. Ann returns from the mental institution, and Heather finds her one day, rocking in her bed. Ann reveals that she is afraid she will be taken by the witches. She says she is cold, so Heather climbs on a trunk to try and close the open window over Ann's bed. A low fog rushes into the room and knocks Heather down, twisting her ankle, and she is taken to the infirmary. The next day, Heather finds Ann's bed empty, her place filled with dead leaves. She witnesses the headmistress lying to the police about Ann's disappearance, remarking that she is being taken care of.

This leads her to become suspicious and she tries to talk to Marcy about it. But Marcy acts strangely, and is shadowed by one of the teachers. Soon after, Heather finds Marcy's bed empty and covered in leaves. Later, she is confronted in the woods by Samantha, who reveals that she has actually been trying to protect Heather with her antics. She tells Heather that the school is led by a coven of witches who want to take all of the girls away. Samantha explains that she has called Heather's father to help her escape and that the milk is poisoned. The girls are both caught by a school mistress, who promptly takes Samantha away. Samantha is later found hanging from a bedsheet in the cafeteria. When a police officer comes to investigate, Heather tells him of the missing students. The officer confronts the headmistress, but she claims that the girls ran away. Another mistress "leads" the officer into the woods to find the girls, where he is killed by the living vines of a tree.

Heather's parents show up to take her home, though the headmistress tries to persuade them otherwise. On the way home, their car is mysteriously flipped and Heather is knocked unconscious. Alice is dragged out of the car by a living vine and kicks Joe in the head, knocking him out. Heather and Joe wake up in a nearby hospital. Before they can reach each other, Ms. Traverse has Heather dragged away, then slits her own hand and forces her black blood down Joe's throat, which puts him into a catatonic state. Heather returns to the school in despair. She drinks the milk that evening, but later vomits it back up, finding tree bark in it. Back at the hospital, Joe wakes up and vomits up Ms. Traverse's black blood, which also has tree bark in it. He quickly escapes and goes to find Heather. That night, Heather begins to hear voices again, and when she attempts to leave, a living vine captures her.

When she awakens, she is wrapped in vines in a large foggy room, next to Ann and Marcy, who are also held captive. All of the teachers appear and reveal themselves to be witches. Ms. Traverse is their leader, and she explains that their spirits have been trapped in the woods all these years, and they need to inhabit the bodies of young women to escape their imprisonment. Heather appears to be the centerpiece of her plan because she has the strongest powers among the gifted students. Heather is coerced into completing the ritual, and the vines begin to mummify all of the girls in the school. Before it can complete itself, Joe breaks into the room with an ax and begins to kill the witches. Heather breaks free from the vines and grabs the ax, proceeding to chop all of the witches into pieces. Heather and Joe then leave with all of the girls, walking down the road into the daylight as the school burns in the distance behind them.

The end of the movie states that Falburn Academy burned to the ground in 1965, while the surrounding woods were strangely left untouched.

Cast

Production
The Woods was shot in 2004 at Mels Cité du Cinema in Montreal, Quebec, Canada.

Release
The Woods had its North American premiere at the Fantasia Film Festival in Montreal in 2006. The film's distributor, United Artists, planned for a theatrical release, but it was shelved after Sony Pictures bought out United Artists' parent company, Metro-Goldwyn-Mayer, in 2004. Sony Pictures Home Entertainment released the film direct-to-DVD in the United States on October 3, 2006 following festival screenings.

Critical response
Rotten Tomatoes, a review aggregator, reports that 69% of 16 surveyed critics gave the film a positive review; the average rating is 6.30/10.

Brian Holcomb of the independent film review website Beyond Hollywood wrote: "The Woods plays like a classic Lewton film of the 1940s, where the emphasis was on telling a good yarn without much ado and wrapping it up in a tightly wound 70 minutes." Film journalist Nick Schager noted that the film "proves to be one of the most polished and inventive horror flicks of the still-ongoing year, a synthesis of classical supernatural and sexualized imagery that expands upon, rather than simply regurgitates, its celebrated predecessors," and compared it to Suspiria (1977) and Carrie (1976). DVD Talks Scott Weinberg praised the film's performances as "uniformly excellent" and also praised the cinematography and musical score.

References

External links 
 
 
 

2006 films
2000s supernatural horror films
American supernatural horror films
Films set in boarding schools
2000s English-language films
Films about witchcraft
Films directed by Lucky McKee
Films scored by John Frizzell (composer)
Films set in 1965
Films shot in Montreal
2000s American films